Joe "The Boss" Hipp (born December 7, 1962) is a retired professional American heavyweight boxer. A member of the Blackfeet Tribe, he became the first Native American to challenge for a world heavyweight boxing championship on August 19, 1995 when he fought WBA champion Bruce Seldon at the MGM Grand Garden Arena. In May 2009, he was inducted into the American Indian Athletic Hall of Fame.

Professional career
Hipp began his professional career with a 4-round decision over Steve Cortez at the Lane County Fairgrounds in Eugene, Oregon on August 29, 1987. For his second fight 2 months later, Hipp travelled to Carson City, Nevada to face Utah native Veti Katoa.  The fight was stopped by the ringside doctor after Hipp suffered a broken jaw in the third round.

Hipp rebounded successfully from the defeat by notching 3 consecutive first-round knockout victories before facing Katoa in a rematch at Gardnerville Park in Gardnerville, Nevada on July 2, 1988. Hipp dominated the action on the inside with his hard-hitting, banging style to take a 5-round unanimous decision.

Hipp then took a year-long hiatus from boxing before returning to face Andrew Matthews on the 4th of July of the following year. Outweighing his opponent by over 30 pounds, Hipp punched his way to a first-round stoppage. Exactly two weeks later, Hipp scored a unanimous four-round decision over up-and-coming contender Cleveland Woods in what Ring Magazine referred to as "...the upset of the night" on the card for that evening.

Hipp began another winning streak (including a brutal third-round knockout of Katoa in their third and final meeting) before facing Bert Cooper in Cooper's final bout prior to his fight with Evander Holyfield for the world title one month later. Cooper outslugged Hipp en route to a fifth-round stoppage by referee Joe Cortez.

Hipp again rebounded by winning 3 consecutive contests before facing Tommy Morrison on June 27, 1992 in Reno, Nevada. In a slugfest that saw Morrison break his jaw and one of his hands, Hipp lost by a 9th-round TKO, resulting in broken cheekbones for Hipp. After recovering from his injuries, Hipp fought once in 1993, earning a victory with a ten-round decision in a rematch with Kevin Ford.

Hipp began 1994 with a victory over Alex Garcia for the fringe NABF heavyweight title and finished the year with two more wins. He began the following year by continuing his winning ways with a third-round TKO of journeyman Phillip Brown. This win would lead to Hipp's most important bout, the fight that would land him in the history books as the first Native American to challenge for one of the four recognized heavyweight title belts.

WBA Heavyweight Title Bout
On August 19, 1995 at the MGM Grand Garden Arena in Las Vegas on the undercard of the infamous Mike Tyson v. Peter McNeeley fight (Tyson's first fight after being released from prison for rape), Hipp squared off against Bruce Seldon for the WBA Heavyweight championship. With Seldon well ahead on all scorecards, the fight was stopped in the tenth round by referee Richard Steele after Hipp experienced massive swelling and bleeding on his face.

Career Decline
Hipp's career was rather undistinguished afterwards. He fired off a series of victories over third-rate competition before being knocked out by hard-hitting journeyman Ross Puritty on June 15, 1997. Hipp had secured a comfortable lead on the scorecards before Puritty came out swinging for the tenth and final round of their bout. An exhausted Hipp was no match for Puritty in the last round and he suffered his first KO defeat. Hipp racked up three consecutive victories against nondescript competition after the Puritty fight, but then blew out his knee against Jeff Pegues in a fifth-round TKO loss on December 9, 1999. 

He attempted a comeback four years later, but that came to an abrupt end in his second fight as he dropped a six-round decision to journeyman Billy Zumbrun on November 14, 2003.

Hipp, referred to as "The Boss" by his loyal fans, returned from another extended layoff to win a six-round decision over Ted Reiter on August 13, 2005, in what was his final fight.

Professional boxing record

|-
|align="center" colspan=8|43 Wins (29 knockouts, 14 decisions), 7 Losses (6 knockouts, 1 decision)
|-
| align="center" style="border-style: none none solid solid; background: #e3e3e3"|Result
| align="center" style="border-style: none none solid solid; background: #e3e3e3"|Record
| align="center" style="border-style: none none solid solid; background: #e3e3e3"|Opponent
| align="center" style="border-style: none none solid solid; background: #e3e3e3"|Type
| align="center" style="border-style: none none solid solid; background: #e3e3e3"|Round
| align="center" style="border-style: none none solid solid; background: #e3e3e3"|Date
| align="center" style="border-style: none none solid solid; background: #e3e3e3"|Location
| align="center" style="border-style: none none solid solid; background: #e3e3e3"|Notes
|-align=center
|Win
|align=left|
|align=left| Ted Reiter
|MD
|6
|13/08/2005
|align=left| Lewiston, Idaho, U.S.
|align=left|
|-
|Loss
|
|align=left| Billy Zumbrun
|MD
|6
|14/11/2003
|align=left| Seattle, Washington, U.S.
|align=left|
|-
|Win
|
|align=left| Chris Brown
|KO
|2
|22/08/2003
|align=left| Spokane, Washington, U.S.
|align=left|
|-
|Loss
|
|align=left| Jeff Pegues
|TKO
|5
|09/12/1999
|align=left| Mount Pleasant, Michigan, U.S.
|align=left|
|-
|Win
|
|align=left| Everett Martin
|UD
|12
|25/06/1999
|align=left| Saint Charles, Missouri, U.S.
|align=left|
|-
|Win
|
|align=left| Jack Basting
|UD
|10
|27/03/1998
|align=left| Tacoma, Washington, U.S.
|align=left|
|-
|Win
|
|align=left| George McFall
|TKO
|2
|11/02/1998
|align=left| Yakima, Washington, U.S.
|align=left|
|-
|Loss
|
|align=left| Ross Puritty
|KO
|10
|15/06/1997
|align=left| Biloxi, Mississippi, U.S.
|align=left|
|-
|Win
|
|align=left| Marcus Rhode
|TKO
|1
|29/03/1997
|align=left| Bellevue, Washington, U.S.
|align=left|
|-
|Win
|
|align=left| Lorenzo Boyd
|KO
|1
|10/03/1997
|align=left| Kansas City, Missouri, U.S.
|align=left|
|-
|Win
|
|align=left| Will Hinton
|TKO
|1
|13/12/1996
|align=left| Tacoma, Washington, U.S.
|align=left|
|-
|Win
|
|align=left| Troy Roberts
|KO
|2
|05/10/1996
|align=left| Yakima, Washington, U.S.
|align=left|
|-
|Win
|
|align=left| Fred Houpe
|TKO
|1
|23/09/1996
|align=left| Bellevue, Washington, U.S.
|align=left|
|-
|Win
|
|align=left| Bill Corrigan
|KO
|1
|04/08/1996
|align=left| Sequim, Washington, U.S.
|align=left|
|-
|Win
|
|align=left| Anthony Moore
|TKO
|5
|17/07/1996
|align=left| Worley, Idaho, U.S.
|align=left|
|-
|Win
|
|align=left| Martin Jacques
|TKO
|1
|15/12/1995
|align=left| Yakima, Washington, U.S.
|align=left|
|-
|Loss
|
|align=left| Bruce Seldon
|TKO
|10
|19/08/1995
|align=left| Las Vegas, Nevada, U.S.
|align=left|
|-
|Win
|
|align=left| Philipp Brown
|TKO
|3
|17/04/1995
|align=left| Moline, Illinois, U.S.
|align=left|
|-
|Win
|
|align=left| Rodolfo Marin
|SD
|10
|01/11/1994
|align=left| Las Vegas, Nevada, U.S.
|align=left|
|-
|Win
|
|align=left| José Ribalta
|KO
|2
|10/05/1994
|align=left| Mashantucket, Connecticut, U.S.
|align=left|
|-
|Win
|
|align=left| Alex Garcia
|UD
|12
|01/03/1994
|align=left| Atlantic City, New Jersey, U.S.
|align=left|
|-
|Win
|
|align=left| Keith McMurray
|KO
|4
|14/01/1994
|align=left| Saint George, Utah, U.S.
|align=left|
|-
|Win
|
|align=left| Kevin Ford
|UD
|10
|03/04/1993
|align=left| Las Vegas, Nevada, U.S.
|align=left|
|-
|Loss
|
|align=left| Tommy Morrison
|TKO
|9
|27/06/1992
|align=left| Reno, Nevada, U.S.
|align=left|
|-
|Win
|
|align=left| Jesse Shelby
|UD
|10
|28/02/1992
|align=left| Las Vegas, Nevada, U.S.
|align=left|
|-
|Win
|
|align=left| Kevin Ford
|UD
|8
|01/02/1992
|align=left| Las Vegas, Nevada, U.S.
|align=left|
|-
|Win
|
|align=left| John Morton
|KO
|3
|05/01/1992
|align=left| Reno, Nevada, U.S.
|align=left|
|-
|Loss
|
|align=left| Bert Cooper
|TKO
|5
|18/10/1991
|align=left| Atlantic City, New Jersey, U.S.
|align=left|
|-
|Win
|
|align=left| Cleveland Woods
|KO
|1
|15/07/1991
|align=left| Irvine, California, U.S.
|align=left|
|-
|Win
|
|align=left| Bill Duncan
|KO
|1
|02/07/1991
|align=left| Phoenix, Arizona, U.S.
|align=left|
|-
|Win
|
|align=left| David Bey
|TKO
|7
|26/02/1991
|align=left| Birmingham, Alabama, U.S.
|align=left|
|-
|Win
|
|align=left| Mike Cohen
|KO
|4
|14/01/1991
|align=left| Fife, Washington, U.S.
|align=left|
|-
|Win
|
|align=left| Richard Cade
|KO
|2
|16/11/1990
|align=left| Fort Lewis, Washington, U.S.
|align=left|
|-
|Win
|
|align=left| Harry Terrell
|KO
|2
|11/09/1990
|align=left| Fife, Washington, U.S.
|align=left|
|-
|Win
|
|align=left| Gerardo Valero
|KO
|1
|26/07/1990
|align=left| Yakima, Washington, U.S.
|align=left|
|-
|Win
|
|align=left| Tracy Thomas
|UD
|10
|12/06/1990
|align=left| Yakima, Washington, U.S.
|align=left|
|-
|Win
|
|align=left| Danny Wofford
|PTS
|6
|24/04/1990
|align=left| Reseda, California, U.S.
|align=left|
|-
|Win
|
|align=left| Veti Katoa
|KO
|3
|16/03/1990
|align=left| Butte, Montana, U.S.
|align=left|
|-
|Win
|
|align=left| Dan Ross
|KO
|1
|12/02/1990
|align=left| Butte, Montana, U.S.
|align=left|
|-
|Win
|
|align=left| Marvin Camel
|TKO
|6
|02/12/1989
|align=left| Lacey, Washington, U.S.
|align=left|
|-
|Win
|
|align=left| Sean McClain
|TKO
|4
|26/09/1989
|align=left| Las Vegas, Nevada, U.S.
|align=left|
|-
|Win
|
|align=left| Shaun Ayers
|UD
|10
|26/08/1989
|align=left| Eugene, Oregon, U.S.
|align=left|
|-
|Win
|
|align=left| Cleveland Woods
|UD
|4
|18/07/1989
|align=left| Las Vegas, Nevada, U.S.
|align=left|
|-
|Win
|
|align=left| Andrew Matthews
|TKO
|1
|04/07/1989
|align=left| Gardnerville, Nevada, U.S.
|align=left|
|-
|Win
|
|align=left| Veti Kotoa
|UD
|5
|02/07/1988
|align=left| Gardnerville, Nevada, U.S.
|align=left|
|-
|Win
|
|align=left| Steve Cortez
|TKO
|1
|18/06/1988
|align=left| Vancouver, Washington, U.S.
|align=left|
|-
|Win
|
|align=left| Paul Bradshaw
|TKO
|1
|04/06/1988
|align=left| Albany, Oregon, U.S.
|align=left|
|-
|Win
|
|align=left| John Elkins
|TKO
|1
|02/06/1988
|align=left| Portland, Oregon, U.S.
|align=left|
|-
|Loss
|
|align=left| Veti Katoa
|TKO
|3
|24/10/1987
|align=left| Carson City, Nevada, U.S.
|align=left|
|-
|Win
|
|align=left| Steve Cortez
|UD
|4
|29/08/1987
|align=left| Eugene, Oregon, U.S.
|align=left|
|}

Outside the Ring
In 2004, Rocky Mountain College and the Billings Writer's Voice sponsored a poetry reading held by various Native American groups in tribute to Hipp.

In December 2005, Hipp was a FEMA worker for the Hurricane Katrina disaster. Responding to the call, he joined his fellow Blackfeet members who were called upon due to their experience in wildfires and search and rescue missions.

By 2007 Hipp was working for his former manager Ray Frye at a Seattle area sweeping company. He also co-owned a small construction company.

References

External links
 

1962 births
20th-century Native Americans
Living people
Boxers from Montana
Native American boxers
Southpaw boxers
Heavyweight boxers
People from Browning, Montana
American male boxers